Fier County, officially the County of Fier, is a county in the Southern Region of the Republic of Albania. The county borders on the Adriatic Sea to the west, the counties of Tirana to the north, Elbasan to the northeast, Berat to the east and Vlorë to the south, Gjirokastër Country to the sud east. It is divided into six municipalities, Fier, Divjakë, Lushnjë, Mallakastër, Patos and Roskovec, with all of whom incorporate forty-two administrative units.

Geography 

Until 2000, Fier County was subdivided into three districts: Fier, Lushnjë, and Mallakastër. Before 2015, it consisted of 42 municipalities.

Demography 

According to the last national census from 2011, Fier County had 310,331 inhabitants. Ethnic groups in the county include:
Albanians = 241,163 (77.71%)
Greeks = 332 (0.11%)
Macedonians = 18 (0.01%)
Montenegrins = 5 (0.00%)
Aromanians = 1,553 (0.50%)
Romani = 1,640 (0,53%)
Egyptians = 75 (0,02%)
others = 171 (0.06%)
no answer = 65,374 (21.07%)

Islam is the largest religion in the county, forming 48.52% of the total population (150,559 people). There are also some Bektashi Muslims with 1.01% (3,137 people), 7.15% percent consisting of believers without a denomination (22,186 people) and Christians forming 15.91% of the county's population (Orthodox (13.76%) (42,993 people), Evangelists (0.11% (331 people) (and Roman Catholics) (1.98%) (6,149 people).

See also 

 Geography of Albania
 Politics of Albania
 Divisions of Albania

References 

 
Fier